Teófilo Martínez (1913 – April 4, 1995) was a Spanish actor.

Awards
Among the awards he received throughout his career include
Golden Antenna
Waves Award in 1955 and 1963

References

1913 births
1995 deaths
Spanish male voice actors
20th-century Spanish male actors